Brett Hayford is a former American football player and coach. He is the athletic director at Pine Lake Preparatory school in Mooresville, North Carolina, a position he had held since 2019. Hayford served as the interim head football coach at his alma mater, Davidson College in Davidson, North Carolina, for the final two games of the 2012 season, compiling a record of 1–1.

Head coaching record

College

Notes

References

Year of birth missing (living people)
Living people
American football defensive linemen
Davidson Wildcats football coaches
Davidson Wildcats football players
High school football coaches in North Carolina